Sir Samuel Benson Dickinson FAusIMM (1 February 1912 - 2 February 2000), generally known as Ben Dickinson, was an Australian geologist and director of mines in South Australia.

Life and career
Dickinson was born in Hobart, a son of Sydney Rushbrook Dickinson (died 1 April 1949) and Margaret Dickinson. He was educated at Haileybury College, Melbourne, where his father was headmaster, and the University of Melbourne, where he graduated BSc (1939) and MSc.

He worked for the Commonwealth government on the North Australian Aerial Geological and Geophysical Survey (1935–1936), was a geologist for Gold Mines of Australia in Victoria, worked with Electrolytic Zinc Co. in Tasmania and with Mt. Isa Mines, Queensland (1937–1941).

He married Jessia Helen Ward (4 March 1910 - 16 March 1993) on 22 November 1941 in Adelaide. They had two sons.

He was appointed Deputy-Director of Mines and Deputy Government Geologist in the Mines Department in 1942, and Director of Mines from 1948 to 1956. Dickinson's greatest achievement during this period "is seen to be the creation of the Geological Survey of SA". Also during this period he was chairman of the Radium Hill Uranium Mining project 1943–1956, and he was responsible for the aerial survey and mapping of the Leigh Creek coalfield.

In 1956, Dickinson resigned from the South Australian Public Service and took the position of director of exploration for Rio Tinto Australia based in Melbourne. He moved to Sydney in 1960 and, on nominal retirement in 1975, returned to Adelaide where he served as a ministerial advisor for a further 10 years.

He was survived by his sons from his first marriage as well as his second wife and their two children.

The basal animal Dickinsonia was named after him by Reg Sprigg.

Recognition
He was knighted in 1980.
He is commemorated by a bronze plaque on North Terrace, Adelaide, a supplementary addition to the original 150 plaques.
He was elected a Fellow of the Australasian Institute of Mining and Metallurgy (FAusIMM)

References 

20th-century Australian geologists
1912 births
2000 deaths
People from Hobart